The C44aci is a model of Australian heavy duty diesel electric locomotive designed by UGL Rail and built at the Broadmeadow factory. It is operated by a number of rail freight operators. The design is based on the National Rail NR class but with some modifications and upgraded features.

Design
The C44aci was designed by UGL Rail in response to a tender issued by Pacific National, who required a locomotive to match the performance of their existing 90 class units when hauling heavy coal traffic, while still having the ability to work high speed intermodal services, with the change between applications to be simple.

The existing UGL Rail Cv40-9i (NR class) locomotive design was used as a base, but with alterations including:
Higher horsepower prime mover
Smaller main alternator
Enlarged radiator size now overhangs the walkway at the number 2 end to cope with the more powerful engine
AC traction motor allowing an increase in haulage capacity
Addition of inline refuelling fittings
Isolated cab for reduced noise and vibration
A new design of fabricated bogies
Increased use of modular construction
Revised transition curves in the underframe to reduce the probability of fatigue cracking
Various body and cab modifications

The NR class design had also been used as a basis for the AC traction QR National 5000 class introduced in 2005. This design did not meet the requirements for Pacific National due to the heavy axle load, acceptable on the heavily laid coal routes, but not on lines outside of the Hunter Valley.

To reduce the weight, the level of fuel carried is altered: for intermodal applications the fuel level is 7,300 litres, for coal applications that permit higher axle loads the fuel level is increased to 13,500 litres, with an intermediate fuel level of 10,750 litres also available. These limits are enforced during refuelling by a float switch in the tank, the permitted level being set by a key switch with an indication displayed in the cab if the limits are breached. The provision of inline refuelling permits the topping up of the tanks in transit from a separate tank wagon behind the locomotives.

The older GE Transportation FDL series engine was chosen instead of the newer GE Evolution Series engine used in the United States, due to the greater height not fitting in the restricted Australian loading gauge, and there being no legal requirement to meet stringent Tier 2 emissions standards which drove adoption of the GEVO series elsewhere. The C44aci has one inverter per traction motor, this differs from competing Downer EDi Rail locomotives that have only one inverter per bogie. A further difference between the C44aci and the competing GT46C ACe is the lack of steering bogies to improve tracking properties and reduce the rate of wheel wear, instead fixed-frame pedestal-type bogies are used where all three axles are always held parallel. However, QUBE's QL class were built with steering bogies included.

Simulation work showed that three C44aci locomotives could equal the performance of 90 class units in heavy mode, while in intermodal mode could outperform the older NR class units by 20% on services, with the same sectional running times and in some areas a slight reduction in fuel consumed due to the increased adhesion resulting from AC traction. However the 4400BHP C44aci was outperformed by the competitors 4500BHP GT46C-ACe locomotive produced by Downer EDi Rail in back-to-back trials performed by RailCorp on the steeply graded Cowan Bank.

By operator

Pacific National
The first of the Pacific National 92 class was officially launched at Port Waratah on 3 October 2008. All 15 units entered service on coal trains in the Hunter Region and were trialed on Brisbane—Melbourne freights and return. In 2012 Pacific National took delivery of six 93 class C44aci locomotives optimised for intermodal freight transport between Melbourne and Brisbane. On 17 January 2013, Pacific National placed an order for another two (later expanded to five) 93 class locomotives. In 2014, Pacific National extended the order of the 93 class to 9324 in which all 24 93 class are in service. 9321-24 are commonly seen on Melbourne-Adelaide intermodal services and other east-coast trains while all other examples are run almost exclusively in the Hunter Valley on coal services.

In October 2021 it was announced that UGL had secured a $297 million order for 50 C44aci locomotives from Pacific National, these locomotives are to have GE's newer Evolution series of engine. The locomotives are to be designed and delivered over a period of 7 years.

Aurizon

In July 2008, QR National subsidiary Australian Railroad Group ordered eight locomotives, with options for 16 more units. Intended for use on their Western Australian standard gauge lines, they were delivered between August and September 2009. These units feature updated electronic control and engine management systems, and had their entry to service delayed by weight issues, with steel body side doors being replaced with lighter aluminium substitutes. Since entering service they have been used on the Koolyanobbing to Esperance iron ore service, in the full fuel load (139 tonnes) configuration.

In January 2009, QR National ordered twelve 6000 class units for use on coal haulage. The first was delivered in October 2009. These units were to be fitted with electronically controlled pneumatic braking equipment, for operation with similarly Hunter Valley Coal wagons.

QR National subsequently ordered an additional 12 locomotives specifically to operate its Coal trains. The first nine were delivered in 2012 as the 6020 class with the final three diverted to Australian Railroad Group as the ACC class.

Aurizon purchased five new 6040 class units were built in 2017–18.

Aurizon ordered 10 new C44aci locomotives in 2021, numbered ACD 6046–6056. As at 27 December 2022, eight have been delivered. 6046 entered service on 19 March 2022, 6047 on 24 March, 6048 on 23 April, 6049 on 24 April. ACD 6050 entered service on 10 October 2022, and 6051 entered service on 12 October 2022. ACD 6052 entered service on 19 December 2022, ACD 6053 entered service on the 29th December 2022, 6054 on the 27th, and ACD 6055 entered service on the 13th of February 2023. 6055's livery features Australian Aboriginal artwork on the long end.

In 2021, ORA took delivery of GWU012-GWU015, these are now owned by Aurizon and used in South Australia and the Northern Territory.

East Coast Rail
East Coast Rail comprises the former One Rail Australia's east coast coal operations in Queensland and NSW. Between April and June 2012, Genesee & Wyoming Australia took delivery of nine locomotives for use on Adelaide to Darwin services, numbered GWU001-GWU009. They eventually found themselves back in NSW. All 30 of the former Glencore and One Rail Australia XRN class are now owned by East Coast Rail as well, though still wearing the GWA/ORA livery. All are used on Hunter Valley coal trains.

RailFirst Asset Management
In 2012–13, CFCLA took delivery of 10 C44aci locomotives as the CF class, numbered CF4402-CF4408, CF4410-CF4412. CF4412 was named Black Caviar and painted in salmon pink, silver and black (which were the racing colours of Black Caviar), as opposed to the standard blue, silver and yellow that CFCLA usually used. In 2016, two (CF4401 & CF4409) were sold to Aurizon, and subsequently being repainted into their 'Canary' scheme, although kept their original numbers. All remaining ten were included in the transfer of assets to Anchorage Capital Partners in January 2020, and subsequent rebranding as Rail First Asset Management in early 2021. Four more were ordered in 2021, and as of 6 June 2022, three were running at UGL Broadmeadow, CF4420 and CF4422.

Centennial Coal
In 2012, Centennial Coal took delivery of seven locomotives for their coal operations. These are operated by Southern Shorthaul Railroad.

Mineral Resources
UGL Rail had four units on the production line for Consolidated Rail Leasing as the CRL class before the order was cancelled. They were completed and retained by UGL as lease units. They along with two units completed for but not delivered to Genesee & Wyoming Australia were sold to Mineral Resources as the MRL class. The first entered service in June 2014 hauling iron ore train from Mount Walton to Kwinana.

Fletcher International Exports
In 2014, three were completed for Fletcher International Exports in attractive red and blue livery to haul the Fletcher's container service from Dubbo to Port Botany. Trains are run by Southern Shorthaul Railroad. A fourth unit (FIE004) was ordered in 2021. In November 2022, it was undergoing outdoor commissioning at UGL Broadmeadow with ACD6052, entering service on 16 November 2022.

Crawfords Freightlines

Two locomotives (known as Spud and Carrot) have become the permanent motive power for the Sandgate to Port Botany container train operated by Crawfords Freightlines, replacing the leased C class locomotives as the motive power.

Qube Holdings

Qube announced the purchase of an unspecified number of locomotives in March 2020, for delivery over 18 months. It was later confirmed that 12 locomotives were to be built. As of 9 November 2021, all 12 locomotives are in service. After initially seeing use on QUBE's various trains throughout NSW they now mainly see use on the BlueScope Steel services out of Port Kembla to Melbourne (Long Island) and Brisbane, now that QUBE have taken this contract over from Pacific National from the 1st of January 2022. In June 2022 QUBE ordered 8 more locomotives.

Fleet

Related development
 National Rail NR class, ancestor model Cv40-9i
 QR National 5000 class, ancestor model C40aci
 QR National 5020 class, heavy haul variant model C44acHi
 Downer EDI Rail GT46C ACe, principal competitor

References

External links
360 panorama of the cabin, as seen from the driver's seat
Rail Express Article - Up close: UGL Rail's C44ACi locomotive
CF CLASS LOCOMOTIVE

Aurizon diesel locomotives
Diesel locomotives of New South Wales
Diesel locomotives of Western Australia
Pacific National diesel locomotives
Railway locomotives introduced in 2008
Standard gauge locomotives of Australia
Diesel-electric locomotives of Australia